The Bryan County Courthouse in Durant, Oklahoma, located at 4th Avenue and Evergreen Street, was built in 1917.  It was designed by architect Jewell Hicks.  It was listed on the National Register of Historic Places in 1984.

It is a three-story courthouse.  It was deemed "significant because of its importance to the county's residents as a center of government, and because it is an elegant example of monumental public architecture. It is particularly notable because its architect was Jewell Hicks, one of the designers of the Oklahoma State Capitol Building."

References

Courthouses in Oklahoma
National Register of Historic Places in Bryan County, Oklahoma
Neoclassical architecture in Oklahoma
Government buildings completed in 1917